CNS demyelinating autoimmune diseases are autoimmune diseases which primarily affect the central nervous system.

Types
Examples include:
 Diffuse cerebral sclerosis of Schilder
 Acute disseminated encephalomyelitis
 Acute hemorrhagic leukoencephalitis
 Multiple sclerosis (though the cause is unknown, it is sure that immune system is involved)
 Transverse myelitis
 Neuromyelitis optica

Presentation
Since the neural impulse is inhibited in this condition it may lead to paresthesia, muscle weakness, unsteady gait, paralysis, vision loss and other motor dysfunctions.

Causes
CNS demyelination autoimmune disease causes the myelin sheath to deteriorate since the sense of recognition of self is lost. The loss of the myelin insulation either disrupts or prevents neural conduction along the nerve cell's axon.

Nervous System
The brain and the spinal cord are the essential components of the central nervous system and it is responsible for the integration of the signals received from the afferent nerves and initiates action. The nerve cells, known as neurons, carry impulses throughout the body and the nerve impulses are carried along the axon. These microscopic nerve fibers, where the action potential occurs, are protected by a white, fatty tissue that surrounds and insulates it, known as the myelin sheath. This insulation helps the axon of a nerve cell with the conduction and speed of the signal along the axon.

Pathogenesis
The pathogenesis of the demyelination can vary. Some of the factors that contribute to the deteriorating of the myelin are due to inflammatory processes, acquired metabolic derangements, viral demyelination, and hypoxic-ischaemic demyelination.

Diagnosis

See also
 Idiopathic inflammatory demyelinating diseases
 Demyelinating disease

References

External links 

Autoimmune diseases